The Office of Energy Efficiency and Renewable Energy (EERE) is an office within the United States Department of Energy. Formed from other energy agencies after the 1973 energy crisis, EERE is led by the Assistant Secretary of Energy Efficiency and Renewable Energy (Assistant Secretary), who is appointed by the president of the United States and confirmed by the U.S. Senate. Alejandro Moreno currently leads the office as the Acting Assistant Secretary.

Mission 
EERE’s mission is to drive the research, development, demonstration, and deployment of innovative technologies, systems, and practices that will (1) help transition Americans to a 100% clean energy economy no later than 2050 and (2) ensure the clean energy economy benefits all Americans.

History
EERE has been established from several previous agencies within the United States Executive branch following the 1973 energy crisis. It has foundations in the former agencies Federal Energy Administration, the Energy Research and Development Administration, the Energy Resource Council, and the Atomic Energy Commission, all established prior to the establishment of Department of Energy (DOE) in 1977. The 1978 National Energy Act consolidated several of the former agencies into the DOE and created an office that focused on energy efficiency and renewable fuels. Since 1978, the office has been renamed several times to reflect its changing scope, including the Office of Conservation and Solar Applications (CSA), the Office of Conservation and Solar Energy (CSE), and the Office of Conservation and Renewable Energy (CRE). The current name, the Office of Energy Efficiency and Renewable Energy, was adopted in 1993.

Management and organization
The Assistant Secretary of Energy Efficiency and Renewable Energy oversees EERE's three technology sectors: renewable energy, sustainable transportation, and energy efficiency. Within these sectors are 11 technology offices and programs that support research, development, and outreach efforts [EERE Organization Chart]. EERE also includes corporate support functions such as the Office of Principal Deputy Assistant Secretary and the Office of Operations.

EERE develops initiatives and programs and provides funding to advance clean energy technologies and integration strategies. EERE oversees the management and operation of the National Renewable Energy Laboratory and provides funding to 12 of the U.S. Department of Energy’s national laboratories:
 Argonne National Laboratory
 Brookhaven National Laboratory
 Idaho National Laboratory
 Lawrence Berkeley National Laboratory
 Lawrence Livermore National Laboratory
 Los Alamos National Laboratory
 National Energy Technology Laboratory
 National Renewable Energy Laboratory
 Oak Ridge National Laboratory
 Pacific Northwest National Laboratory
 Sandia National Laboratories
 Savannah River National Laboratory

EERE technology sectors

Sustainable transportation sector

The Vehicle Technologies Office supports the research, development, and deployment of efficient transportation technologies such as plug-in electric vehicles, batteries, electric drive technologies, advanced combustion engines, lightweight materials, and alternative fuels, including natural gas and propane.

The Bioenergy Technologies Office supports research, development, and deployment projects for advanced biofuels.

The Hydrogen and Fuel Cell Technologies Office conducts research, development, and deployment in hydrogen and fuel cell technologies.

Renewable energy sector
The Solar Energy Technologies Office, also known as the SunShot Initiative, funds cooperative research, development, demonstration, and deployment projects by private companies, universities, state and local governments, nonprofit organizations, and national laboratories. It focuses on photovoltaics, concentrating solar power, soft costs (the non-hardware costs of solar), commercializing technologies, and integrating solar with the grid.

The Geothermal Technologies Office supports research and development for geothermal technologies.

The Wind Energy Technologies Office conducts research and development activities in land-based and offshore wind power and works with national laboratories, universities, laboratories, and industries.

The Water Power Program researches, tests, evaluates, and develops hydropower and hydrokinetic energy technologies.

Energy efficiency sector
The Building Technologies Office supports research, development, and deployment activities to reduce energy use in U.S. buildings. The office's long-term objective is to reduce the energy use intensity of homes and commercial buildings by 50% or more.

The Federal Energy Management Program seeks methods and technology to reduce energy use and increase the use of renewable energy at federal agencies.

The Advanced Manufacturing Office works with industry, small business, universities, and other stakeholders and supports research into energy-efficient technologies for industries.

The Weatherization and Intergovernmental Programs Office is one of the primary forums for helping state and local governments implement cost-effective and productive energy systems for American homes, communities, businesses, and industries. The program's mission is to enable strategic investments in energy efficiency and renewable energy technologies and innovative practices across the U.S. by a wide range of government, community and business stakeholders, in partnership with state and local organizations and community-based nonprofits.  WIP is made up of two programs focused on state and local governments and two teams that develop and deliver targeted technical assistance and strategic initiatives to state and local governments. 
 The State Energy Program (SEP) provides funding and technical assistance to states, territories, and the District of Columbia to enhance energy security, advance state-led energy initiatives, and maximize the benefits of decreasing energy waste. SEP emphasizes each state's key role as the decision maker and administrator for program activities within the state that are tailored to their unique resources, delivery capacity, and energy goals.
 The Weatherization Assistance Program (WAP) reduces energy costs for low-income households by increasing the energy efficiency of their homes, while ensuring their health and safety. The program provides funding to states and territories for locally-run weatherization services to approximately 35,000 homes every year. States contract with community action agencies, non-profits, and local governments that use in-house employees and private contractors to deliver services to low-income families. WAP has served more than 7 million families since program inception in 1976.
 The Partnerships and Technical Assistance Team (P&TA) serves as the nexus of state and local governments to catalyze lead-by-example programs by developing tools and solutions to barriers facing state and local governments; convening and creating peer exchanges to showcase public-sector leadership and effective public-private partnerships; and providing information from leading technical experts. P&TA cultivates diverse partnerships and provides technical assistance through initiatives that include the Better Buildings Challenge, Better Communities Alliance, and Better Buildings Accelerators.
 The Strategic and Interagency Initiatives team leads inter-organizational initiatives that provide states and local governments technical assistance to help underserved communities have access to more energy choices. DOE's Clean Energy for Low Income Communities Accelerator and Remote Alaskan Communities Energy Efficiency Competition initiatives demonstrate replicable, scalable models that address barriers to energy efficiency and renewable energy access in low and moderate income communities.

Public outreach
EERE manages the Energy Saver website that promotes energy-efficient technologies for heating, cooling, and weatherizing buildings and lists tips for saving electricity and fuel.

The Office of EERE sponsors several activities aimed at public outreach and engagement in energy efficiency and renewable energy technologies.

Academic competitions

The Solar Decathlon is a competition held every other year where collegiate teams design, build, and operate solar-powered houses. The competition winner is the team that best blends affordability, consumer appeal, and design with optimal energy production and maximum efficiency. These homes are judged in 10 contests.

In the EcoCAR 3 challenge, 16 university teams redesign a Chevrolet Camaro to reduce its environmental impact without reducing its performance. It is sponsored by DOE and General Motors and managed by Argonne National Laboratory.

The Race to Zero Student Design Competition teaches college students about the building science field by challenging them to design zero energy ready homes.

In the BioenergizeME Infographic Challenge, students in grades 9-12 use technology to research, interpret, apply, and then design an infographic that responds to one of four cross-curricular bioenergy topics.

The Collegiate Wind Competition is a contest where college teams are judged by their ability to design a wind turbine based on market research, develop a business plan to market the product, build and test the turbine against set requirements, and demonstrate knowledge of siting constraints and location challenges for product installation.

In partnership with the Center for Advanced Energy Studies and the Idaho National Laboratory, the Geothermal Technologies Offices hosts a competition for high school and university teams. Teams of two to three members research data, interpret information, and design an infographic that tells a compelling story about the future of geothermal energy.

The Hydrogen Student Design Contest "challenges undergraduate and graduate students worldwide to apply design, engineering, economic, environmental science, business and marketing skills to the hydrogen and fuel cell industries."

Other competitions
In the Georgetown University Energy Prize competition, cities and counties with populations between 5,000 and 250,000 compete for a multi-year $5 million prize for demonstrating energy use reduction over a two-year period.

The Cleantech University Prize provides competitive funding for business development and commercialization training to clean energy entrepreneurs.

The Wave Energy Prize is aims to increase the number of organizations involved in wave energy converter technology development. In 2016, 92 registered teams competed not only for the $1.5 million prize, but for opportunities at seed funding and access to testing facilities, experts in the field, and an online "marketplace" that connected teams, investors, and contributors.

References

External links

 Office of Energy Efficiency and Renewable Energy

United States Department of Energy agencies
Energy policy of the United States
Climate change policy in the United States
Renewable energy organizations based in the United States
Electric vehicles in the United States